Amir Tafa (born 3 March 1993) is an Albanian professional footballer who most recently played for Tërbuni Pukë in the Albanian First Division.

References

1993 births
Living people
Footballers from Shkodër
Albanian footballers
Association football midfielders
KF Vllaznia Shkodër players
FK Partizani Tirana players
KS Ada Velipojë players
KS Burreli players
KF Tërbuni Pukë players
Kategoria Superiore players
Kategoria e Parë players